Erie International Airport Tom Ridge Field  is a public airport  southwest of Erie, in Erie County, Pennsylvania, United States. Airline service at Erie faces stiff competition from the Pittsburgh, Cleveland, Buffalo, and Toronto airports, all within three hours of Erie by car. In 2004, Erie was the third-fastest-growing airport in the United States, and the fastest-growing airport in Pennsylvania.

The airport is named for former Pennsylvania governor, former United States Secretary of Homeland Security, and Erie native Tom Ridge.

History

History
Soon after, a flight training school was based at the field. In 1927, as part of a nationwide tour by Charles Lindbergh after his transatlantic flight, Erie was selected as one of the cities where Lindbergh would make a brief stopover. Griswold Field proved inadequate for the larger Spirit of St. Louis and an alternative site could not be located, so a flyover by Lindbergh had to suffice.

This showed the need for a proper airport and prompted the Erie City Council to consider establishing a municipal airport. After recommendations made by Lindbergh to a Congressional committee that no airport less than  be approved, the planning commission for Erie's airport began to reevaluate the site.

Griswold Field officially closed in 1929 when Griswold moved to Long Island, but aircraft and the flight school continued to use it. That year two airfields were established: one on land next to the former Griswold Field, and another in Kearsarge that is now the site of the Millcreek Mall.

American Airlines began the airport's airline service in June 1938; American remained until 1953 when Allegheny replaced it. Mohawk arrived on December 1, 1956 and Lake Central on January 1, 1957; Capital Airlines flights ended in 1960–61.

Prior to September 11, 2001, the airport was at its height with US Airways mainline jets to Pittsburgh and international service to Toronto. After 9/11 US Airways replaced 737s and DC-9s with regional jets. As air service rebounded in the mid-2000s, US Airways Express flew to Pittsburgh, Philadelphia and Charlotte; Northwest Airlink to Detroit; Continental Connection to Cleveland; and Delta Connection to Cincinnati and Atlanta. US Airways discontinued Charlotte flights in 2006. Delta Air Lines discontinued Atlanta flights on September 6, 2007. In early 2008 US Airways discontinued Pittsburgh flights.

On August 22, 2018, Derek Martin was named Executive Director of the airport.
	
On February 24, 2020, non-stop service to Washington Dulles International Airport (IAD) on United Express was announced. The service was made possible by a $292,000 grant from the U.S. Department of Transportation's Small Community Air Service Development Program.

On June 5, 2020, Delta announced that it would indefinitely suspend service starting July 8 due to the COVID-19 pandemic.

Current operations

As of August 2019, American Eagle service is two flights daily to Charlotte on the CRJ-700; Delta Connection had three flights daily to Detroit with CRJ-200 regional jets (currently suspended); and United Express has two flights daily to Chicago–O'Hare also with ERJ-145 or E-170 aircraft.

Runway extension
The  extension of runway 6/24 was opened on November 8, 2012. The total cost of the project was $80.5 million, or approximately $5 million under budget. Owing to a mild winter in 2011–2012 that did not hinder construction work, the extension was also completed two years ahead of schedule.

Facilities

 Runway 2/20: , surface: asphalt
 Runway 6/24: , surface: asphalt/concrete

The airport has a passenger terminal building that opened in 1958 and has had several expansions and upgrades since its construction. The 1970s saw expansions to baggage claim facilities and later an office expansion for FAA office facilities on the second floor. A ticketing area on the western end of the terminal building was added in 1990. Upgrades to the lobby area and boarding gates and passenger boarding bridges followed in the late 1990s and early 2000s. The first floor of the passenger terminal building, which houses the baggage claim, check in desks, rental car counters, cafe, TSA checkpoint, and boarding gate areas occupies approximately 43,200 square feet.

In August 2019, the public waiting area and in-terminal restaurant were renovated. The entrance to the restaurant was reconfigured to provide airside access from the secure side of the terminal.

The terminal has seven gates, four with jetbridges for regional aircraft. Gate 5 was previously used by Delta Connection but service has been suspended. Current regularly occupied gates are:

 Gate 1 & 3 - United Express
 Gate 5 & 7 - American Eagle

Airlines and destinations

Passenger

Destinations map

Cargo

Statistics

Airline market share

^ - Operates as American Eagle and United Express 
* - Operates as American Eagle  
** - Operates as United Express

Top destinations

Annual traffic

Ground transportation

Bus 
The Erie Metropolitan Transit Authority's Route 31 includes a stop at the airport.

Car rental 
Avis Rent a Car System, Budget Rent a Car, Enterprise Rent-A-Car, The Hertz Corporation, and National Car Rental have counters at the airport.

Shuttle/limousine 
Various local hotels, along with the locally owned Hansen's Errand Service and Rupp Limousine, provide shuttle services to and from the airport.

Rideshare 
Local drivers for Uber and Lyft provide ridesharing services to and from the airport and throughout the Erie area.

Accidents and incidents
 February 21, 1986: A USAir McDonnell Douglas DC-9-31, registration number N961VJ, operating as Flight 499 on a scheduled flight from Toronto Pearson International Airport, overran runway 24 during a tailwind landing. The aircraft struck a runway light and a fence and came to rest on a perimeter road. One passenger suffered minor injuries, while the other 17 passengers and 5 crew were uninjured; the aircraft was badly damaged and was written off. Unable to land on runway 6 due to inadequate visibility, the pilots instead chose to land on runway 24 due to more favorable visibility minimums, although tailwind landings were not authorized on wet and snowy pavement. The aircraft touched down past the displaced threshold at an excessive airspeed; braking on the snowy runway was poor and the pilots had to manually deploy the spoilers. The crash was attributed to the pilot in command's improper decision-making and failure to perform a go-around; contributing factors were the adverse weather conditions, the improper touchdown point, and the displaced threshold.
 June 8, 2000: A Beechcraft BE-55 Baron, registration number N777K, lost engine power on approach after the pilot attempted to cross-feed the left-hand engine from the right-hand fuel tank due to a lack of fuel in the left-hand tank. The aircraft was destroyed in the subsequent crash and post-crash fire; the pilot, who was the sole aircraft occupant, suffered minor injuries. The accident was attributed to fuel starvation caused by the pilot's fuel system mismanagement; a contributing factor was inadequate preflight fuel planning.
 August 13, 2005: A Piper PA-28-180, registration number N7534W, lost engine power on approach and struck trees during an attempted forced landing about  short of runway 24, killing the pilot and two passengers; another passenger suffered serious injuries. The accident was attributed to fuel exhaustion caused by the pilot's inadequate preflight planning.

References

Sources

External links
Airport Master Record (FAA Form 5010), also available as a printable form (PDF)
Erie International Airport
Pennsylvania Bureau of Aviation: Erie International Airport

1936 establishments in Pennsylvania
Airports established in 1936
Airports in Pennsylvania
Transportation buildings and structures in Erie County, Pennsylvania
Transportation in Erie, Pennsylvania
Works Progress Administration in Pennsylvania